The Holy Rosary Institute is a historic school building located at 421 Carmel Street in Lafayette, Louisiana. It is one of the few remaining historic Black Catholic high school buildings in the United States.

History 
The original Greek Revival building, now surrounded by other modern school buildings, was founded in 1913 by Reverend Philip Keller and the Sisters of the Holy Family. 

The institute was initially built in order to provide vocational and technical education for black females. It also served as a Normal School to train teachers for rural black schools. In 1947, it became a co-ed facility. Enrollment began to decline in the 1960s and in 1974, the boarding facilities were closed.  

The building was listed on the National Register of Historic Places on December 3, 1980.

The school was closed in 1993. After a series of plans to restore the building fell through, funding for restoration was acquired and groundbreaking began on the project in late 2020.

See also
 National Register of Historic Places listings in Lafayette Parish, Louisiana

References

School buildings on the National Register of Historic Places in Louisiana
Greek Revival architecture in Louisiana
School buildings completed in 1913
Lafayette Parish, Louisiana
National Register of Historic Places in Lafayette Parish, Louisiana
1913 establishments in Louisiana

African-American Roman Catholic schools
Sisters of the Holy Family (Louisiana)